In optics, a thin lens is a lens with a thickness (distance along the optical axis between the two surfaces of the lens) that is negligible compared to the radii of curvature of the lens surfaces. Lenses whose thickness is not negligible are sometimes called thick lenses.

The thin lens approximation ignores optical effects due to the thickness of lenses and simplifies ray tracing calculations. It is often combined with the paraxial approximation in techniques such as ray transfer matrix analysis.

Focal length
The focal length, f, of a lens in air is given by the lensmaker's equation:

where n is the index of refraction of the lens material, and R1 and R2 are the radii of curvature of the two surfaces. For a thin lens, d is much smaller than one of the radii of curvature (either R1 or R2). In these conditions, the last term of the Lensmaker's equation becomes negligible, and the focal length of a thin lens in air can be approximated by

Here R1 is taken to be positive if the first surface is convex, and negative if the surface is concave. The signs are reversed for the back surface of the lens: R2 is positive if the surface is concave, and negative if it is convex. This is an arbitrary sign convention; some authors choose different signs for the radii, which changes the equation for the focal length.

Image formation
Certain rays follow simple rules when passing through a thin lens, in the paraxial ray approximation:
Any ray that enters parallel to the axis on one side of the lens proceeds towards the focal point  on the other side. 
Any ray that arrives at the lens after passing through the focal point  on the front side, comes out parallel to the axis on the other side. 
Any ray that passes through the center of the lens will not change its direction.

If three such rays are traced from the same point on an object in front of the lens (such as the top), their intersection will mark the location of the corresponding point on the image of the object. By following the paths of these rays, the relationship between the object distance s and the image distance s′ can be shown to be

which is known as the thin lens equation.

Physical optics
In scalar wave optics a lens is a part which shifts the phase of the wave-front. Mathematically this can be understood as a multiplication of the wave-front with the following function:

.

References

Lenses